= Norges Ishockeydommerklubb =

Norges Ishockeydommerklubb (NIHDK) (English: The Norwegian Association of Icehockey Referees) is an interest group for referees of ice hockey in Norway. The association's main purpose is to look after the rights of referees on the nationwide levels below the Norwegian Elite League. The association was founded on August 4, 1982.
